Marko Đurković (born February 24, 1987) is a retired Serbian professional basketball player who last played for KK Sutjeska of the Montenegrin Basketball League.

References

External links
 Eurobasket.com profile
 FIBA.com profile

Living people
1987 births
ABA League players
Basketball League of Serbia players
BBC Monthey players
BC Zepter Vienna players
CSU Pitești players
KK Igokea players
KK Krka players
KK Partizan players
KK Rabotnički players
KK Sloga players
KK Vizura players
OKK Borac players
SCM U Craiova (basketball) players
Serbian expatriate basketball people in Austria
Serbian expatriate basketball people in Montenegro
Serbian expatriate basketball people in North Macedonia
Serbian expatriate basketball people in Romania
Serbian expatriate basketball people in Slovakia
Serbian expatriate basketball people in Slovenia
Serbian expatriate basketball people in Switzerland
Serbian expatriate basketball people in Tunisia
Serbian men's basketball players
Serbs of Bosnia and Herzegovina
Sportspeople from Banja Luka
Power forwards (basketball)